Eszter Anita Tomaskovics  (born 23 August 1987) is a Hungarian female water polo player. She was a member of the Hungary Women's National Team. She was a part of the Hungarian team that claimed the gold medal at the 2005 FINA World Championship in Montreal, Quebec, Canada. She also competed in the 2007 and 2009 FINA World Championships. At club level, she has played most notably for Vasas, Honvéd (2005–2008) and Olympiacos (2008–2010), winning numerous titles.

See also
 List of world champions in women's water polo
 List of World Aquatics Championships medalists in water polo

References

External links
 

1987 births
Living people
Hungarian female water polo players
Olympiacos Women's Water Polo Team players
Place of birth missing (living people)
20th-century Hungarian women
21st-century Hungarian women